La Maison Rouge was a private contemporary art Foundation dedicated mainly to showing private art collections, monographic shows of contemporary artists' work. It was located close to the Bastille, in Paris, at 10 Boulevard de la Bastille in the 12th arrondissement of Paris. La Maison Rouge has been definitely closed in October 2018.

History
Created in 2004 by Contemporary Art Collector Antoine de Galbert, La maison rouge occupied an old factory building. The 2000-square-meter space was renovated by architect Jean-Yves Clément and the artist Jean-Michel Alberola. The Foundation offices were located at the center the building in what used to be an old red farmhouse (hence its name). La maison rouge had an adjacent bookstore run by Bookstorming  and a branch of Rose Bakery, an organic English style cafe, that renewed its entire decoration with each exhibition.

Exhibitions

2004
 Central Station - The Harald Falckenberg Collection
 Anthony McCall - Solid Light Films
 L'intime, behind closed doors: the private world of collectors.

2005
 Luc Delahaye, photography
 Tadashi Yamaneko, Shinjuku
 Dieter Appelt, Cinema Prisma
 Arnulf Rainer and his Art Brut Collection.
 Berlinde de Bruyckere, Eén (Un)
 Ann Hamilton, Phora

2006
 Busy Going Crazy, The Sylvio Perlstein Collection, Art & Photography from Dada to our days.
 Sound and Fury, the Works of Henry Darger.
 Michaël Borremans, Paintings and Drawings
 Les livres cuits:  Denise A. Aubertin
 Une vision du monde, The video-art collection of Isabelle and Jean-Conrad Lemaître.

2007
 Mutatis, Mutandis
 Tetsumi Kudo, la montagne que nous cherchons est dans la serre
 Patrick Van Caeckenbergh
 Felice Varini
 Pavillon Seroussi
 Sots Art Political Art in Russia from 1972 to today.

2008
 Gregor Schneider, Süsser Duft
 Pilar Albarracin, Mortal cadencia
 Marie Maillard
 Elmar Trenkwalder
 Augustin Lesage
 Andrea Blum

2009
 VRAOUM ! An Exhibition of Comic Strips and Contemporary Art.

2010
 Marco Decorpeliada: Schizomètres
 Céleste Boursier Mougenot
 Face B a project by Daniela Franco.
 Vinyl : Records and Covers by Artists The Guy Schraenen Collection.
  Peter Buggenhout, It's a Strange, Strange World, Sally
 Journey inside my head Antoine de Galbert's collection of ethnic headdresses. (co-curators: Antoine de Galbert and Bérénice Geoffroy-Schneiter)
  Jean de Maximy, Suite inexacte en homologie singulière.
 Investigations of a Dog – Works from Five European Art Foundations, FACE  (curated in Paris by : Paula Aisemberg and Noëlig Le Roux).

2011
 All Cannibals (curated by Jeanette Zwingenberger)
 Chiharu Shiota, Home of Memory.
 My Winnipeg, Winnipeg's Contemporary Art Scene.
 Memories of the future, The Olbricht Collection.

2012
 Neon, Who's Afraid of Red, Yellow and Blue? (curated by David Rosenberg)
 Louis Soutter, The Tremor of Modernity
 Didier Vermeiren, Sculptures-Photographies.
 Retour à l’intime, The Giuliana and Tommaso Setari Collection.

2013
 Under the influence,  Visual Arts and Psychotropics.
 My Joburg,  Johannesburg's Art Scene.
 Theatre of the World, The collections of David Walsh.

References

External links
 

Art museums and galleries in Paris
Buildings and structures in the 12th arrondissement of Paris
Private collections in France